Dark Hole is a South Korean television series starring Kim Ok-vin and Lee Joon-hyuk. The fifth series of OCN's "Dramatic Cinema" project which combines film and drama formats, premiered on OCN TV on April 30, 2021.

Synopsis 
Dark Hole is about a group of survivors who have to fight for their lives against mutants that are created when humans breathe mysterious dark smoke from a sinkhole.

Cast

Main 
 Kim Ok-vin as Lee Hwa-sun
 Lee Joon-hyuk as Yoo Tae-han

Supporting 
 Park Keun-rok as Choi Seung-tae
 Yoon Jung-hoon as Woo-sang
 Jang Sung-won as Lee Young-tae
 Kim Do-hoon as Lee Jin-seok
 Im Won-hee as Park Soon-il
 Jeon Young-mi
 Cho Ja-In as Cho Hyun-Ho
 Bae Jung-hwa
 Oh Yu-jin as Han Dong-rim
 Kim Byung-ki as Choi Kyeong-soo
 Kim Han-jong as Nam Yeong-sik
 Lee Ha-eun as Yoon Saet-byeol
 Song Sang-eun as Kim Seon-nyeo
 Kim Kang-min as Min-gyu

Special Appearances 
 Tak Jae-hoon as Restaurant Owner

Production 
OCN announced its lineup of 2021 drama slate in November 2020 which included the fifth installment of the 'Dramatic Cinema' project, Dark Hole.

Casting 
OCN revealed the casting news of Kim Ok-vin and Lee Joon-hyuk on October 9, 2020. On December 11, 2020, Yoon Jung-hoon was confirmed to join the cast and on December 14, 2020, Jang Sung-won reportedly joined the cast. The photos from the first script reading were released by OCN on March 2, 2021.

Viewership

References

External links 
  
 
 

OCN television dramas
Korean-language television shows
2021 South Korean television series debuts
South Korean mystery television series
South Korean fantasy television series
2021 South Korean television series endings